Vemuru is a village in Bapatla district of the India state of Andhra Pradesh. It is the headquarters of Vemuru Mandal of Bapatla revenue division.

Demographics 

 census, the town had a population of 9,796. The total population constitute, 4,850 males and 4,946 females –a sex ratio of 1020 females per 1000 males. 876 children are in the age group of 0–6 years, of which 457 are boys and 419 are girls. The average literacy rate stands at 81.32% with 6,457 literates, significantly higher than the state average of 72.39%.

Transport

APSRTC operates busses from Tenali on Tenali – Kollur route. Vemuru railway station is located on Tenali–Repalle branch line of Guntur-Repalle section. It is administered under Guntur railway division of South Central Railways.

Eminent personalities

 Vemuri Gaggaiah (1895–1955), popular Telugu theater artist and film actor, was born in this village. He was well known for portraying horrifying cruel roles.
 Konijeti Rosaiah, Governor of Tamil Nadu.

See also 
 Vemuru mandal
 Vemuru mandal villages

References

External links

Villages in Guntur district
Mandal headquarters in Guntur district